The Brass Bottle is a 1964 American fantasy-comedy film about a modern man who accidentally acquires the friendship of a long-out-of-circulation genie. It is based on the 1900 novel of the same title by Thomas Anstey Guthrie and later inspired the American fantasy sitcom I Dream of Jeannie.

The film stars Tony Randall, Burl Ives and Barbara Eden.

Plot
Architect Harold Ventimore (Tony Randall) buys a large antique container that turns out to imprison a genie named Fakrash Alamash (Burl Ives), whom Harold inadvertently sets free. Fakrash is effusively grateful for his release, and persistently tries to do favors for Harold to show his gratitude. However he has been in the brass bottle for a long time, and Fakrash's unfamiliarity with the modern world causes all sorts of problems when he tries to please his rescuer. Harold ends up in a great deal of trouble, including with his girlfriend, Sylvia Kenton (Barbara Eden).

Cast
Tony Randall as Harold Ventimore
Burl Ives as Fakrash
Barbara Eden as Sylvia Kenton
Kamala Devi as Tezra, a female genie
Edward Andrews as Professor Kenton
Lulu Porter as a belly dancer
Richard Erdman as Seymour Jenks
Kathie Browne as Hazel Jenks
Ann Doran as Martha Kenton
Philip Ober as William Beevor
Parley Baer as Samuel Wackerbath
Howard Smith as Senator Grindle

Production

Background
Thomas Anstey Guthrie's novel, on which the film is based, had been adapted for the screen twice before during the era of silent film in 1914 and 1923.

Casting
At this point in his career, Tony Randall was one of Hollywood's leading supporting players, and this film represented a "rare opportunity" for him to get first billing.

Filming
The Brass Bottle was made on a modest budget and shot primarily on the back lot of Universal Studios, with a few exterior sequences made with rear screen projection, "giving the feature film the look of a standard sitcom from the era."

Release and reception
The Brass Bottle was released on May 20, 1964.

Home media
The Brass Bottle was released on DVD for Region 1 (U.S. and Canada only) as part of the Universal Vault Series in January 2010.

Critical response

Contemporary
The New York Times critic A. H. Weiler found the film "about as funny as your own funeral", and dismissed it as "one of the duller fantasies dreamed up by Hollywood's necromancers."

Retrospective
Tony Mastroianni says The Brass Bottle is 'not a bad little movie" for what it is: "well-made but rather unpretentious."  Craig Butler calls The Brass Bottle a "silly and fairly predictable comedy, the kind that Hollywood was making in the early 1960s before it figured out that people were more and more getting this kind of fluff on television, where it was more at home." While not a great comedy, it is "pleasant, amiable and diverting".

Legacy
Eden's role was instrumental in getting her cast as the star of the TV series I Dream of Jeannie, even though she did not play a genie in this film.

Remakes
This film was remade in Tamil by Javar Sitaraman as Pattanathil Bhootham (or Ghost in the City) in 1967.

See also
List of American films of 1964
Old Khottabych
Khottabych

References

External links

1964 films
1960s fantasy comedy films
American fantasy comedy films
1960s English-language films
Films about wish fulfillment
Films based on British novels
Films directed by Harry Keller
Genies in film
Universal Pictures films
1964 comedy films
I Dream of Jeannie
1960s American films